Townsend is a topographic surname of Yorkshire and Norfolk origin, indicating residence at the extremity of a city or burgh (from Middle English touun "village", "hamlet", "stead" + ende "end".) Popular variants are Townshend (of Norfolk variety), and Townend.

Given name
Townsend Bell, motor racing driver
Townsend Coleman, American voice actor
Townsend Cromwell, oceanographer
Townsend Dodd, US Army aviator
Townsend Harris, 19th century American merchant and politician
Townsend Hoopes, former Undersecretary of the US Air Force
Townsend Saunders, Olympic medalist in wrestling
Townsend Scudder, US Congressman from New York
Townsend Whelen, American hunter, soldier, writer, outdoorsman and rifleman

Middle name
 Charles Townsend Ludington, American aviator
 Cyrus Townsend Brady, American journalist
 Frederick Townsend Martin, American author
 Frederick Townsend Ward, American mercenary
 James Townsend Saward, English barrister and forger
 John Townsend Trowbridge, American author
 Light Townsend Cummins, American educator and historian
 Lynn Townsend White, Jr., American professor
 Mary Townsend Seymour, African-American politician
 Sylvia Townsend Warner, English novelist and poet
 Thomas Townsend Brown, American inventor

Surname

Townsend

 A. A. Townsend, American pioneer and politician
 Albert Alan Townsend (1917–2010), Australian fluid dynamicist
 Alf Townsend, rugby league footballer of the 1920s for New Zealand
 Amos Townsend (1821–1895), American politician
 Andre Townsend, American football player
 Andros Townsend, English football player
 Andy Townsend, Irish soccer player
 Anna Townsend, American silent film actress
 Anel Townsend, Peruvian politician
 Ben Townsend, English football player
 Bertha Townsend, American tennis player
 Bill Townsend, American entrepreneur
 Boris Townsend, English physicist
 Brian Townsend (poker player), American poker player
 Camilla Townsend (born 1965), American historian
 Cathy Townsend (born 1937), Canadian ten-pin bowler
 Charles Townsend (disambiguation) (multiple, includes "Charlie")
 Chauncy Townsend, British politician
 Chris Townsend (disambiguation)
 Clinton Paul Townsend (1868 — 1931), American chemist
 M. Clifford Townsend, former Governor of the U.S. state of Indiana
 Cyril Townsend, Sir Cyril David Townsend (1937-2013), British politician.
 Dallas Townsend, Dallas S. Townsend, Jr., American broadcaster
 Darian Townsend, South African swimmer
 Dave Townsend, contemporary British musician
 David Townsend (disambiguation)
 Deshea Townsend, American football player
Dequan Townsend, American mixed martial artist
 Devin Townsend, Canadian musician
 Douglas Townsend, American composer
 Dwight Townsend (1826-1899), U.S. Representative from New York
 E. Reginald Townsend, American politician and journalist
 Ed Townsend, song writer
 Eddie Townsend, boxing trainer
 Edward D. Townsend, Adjutant General of the United States Army
 Eliza Townsend (1788-1854), American poet
 Elizabeth Sthreshley Townsend (died 1919), American inventor
 Emma Jose Townsend, British recipient of the Empire Gallantry Medal
 Emily Vermeule, née Emily Dickinson Townsend
 F. H. Townsend, British cartoonist and illustrator (1868-1920)
Fitzhugh Townsend (1872–1906), American fencer
 Frances Townsend, former Homeland Security Adviser to U.S. President George W. Bush
 Francis Townsend, creator of the proposal for an old-age pension plan during the Great Depression
 Franklin Townsend (1821–1898), 47th Mayor of Albany, New York, Adjutant General of the State of New York
 Frederick Townsend (1825–1897), Union Army officer in the Civil War, Adjutant General of New York
 Fred Townsend, American politician
 Gareth Townsend, English cricketer and cricket coach
 George Alfred Townsend ("Gath"), war correspondent
 George Fyler Townsend (Reverend), British writer and translator
 Gregor Townsend, Scottish rugby player
 Harry Everett Townsend WWI war artist
 Henry Townsend (missionary) (1815–1886), Anglican missionary
 Henry Townsend (musician) (1909–2006), American blues singer, guitarist and pianist
 Henry Townsend (Norwich) (1626–1695), early American colonist born in Norwich, Norfolk, England
 Henry Townsend (Oyster Bay) (1649–1703), American colonist born in Oyster Bay
 Howard Townsend (1823–1867), physician and lecturer in Albany, New York
 James Townsend (disambiguation), several people
 Jill Townsend, American actress
 John Townsend (author) (born 1956), American psychologist and author
 John Townsend (basketball) (died 2001), American basketball player
 John Townsend (footballer) (born 1943), Australian rules footballer
 John Townsend (Mayor) (1783–1854), 37th mayor of Albany, NY
 John Townsend (Norwich) (1608–1668), early American settler in Oyster Bay, Long Island
 John Townsend (Wisconsin politician), American politician
 John Townsend (MP for Greenwich) (1819–1892), British politician and Member of Parliament for Greenwich
 John Townsend (Irish politician) (1737–1810), Irish MP for Dingle, Doneraile and Castlemartyr
 John G. Townsend, Jr. (1871–1964), American businessman and politician, Governor and Senator from Delaware
 John Kirk Townsend (1809–1851), American naturalist
 John Rowe Townsend (born 1922), British children's author
 John Sealy Townsend (1868–1957), Irish physicist
 John Selby Townsend, American politician
 Johnny Townsend (American football), American football player
 Joseph Townsend (1737–1816), English minister and economist
 Kathleen Kennedy Townsend, American politician
 Lady Juliet Townsend (1941–2014), British writer and Lord Lieutenant of Northamptonshire
 Larry Townsend (politician), American politician
 Lauren Townsend (disambiguation), several people
 Lena Townsend, British politician
 Les Townsend, Australian cricket umpire
 Leslie Townsend (disambiguation)
 Madame Lawrence Townsend (see Natalie Townsend)
 Mark Lee Townsend, American rock guitarist
 Mary Townsend  (1822-1869), New Zealand artist
 Mary Townsend (entomologist) (1814-1851), American abolitionist and entomologist 
 Mary Ashley Townsend (1836-1901), American poet and writer
 Michael Townsend, English footballer
 Mike Townsend, American football player
 Natalie Townsend (1866-1962), American composer aka Pearl Townsend and Madam Lawrence Townsend)
 Norman Townsend, Australian cricket umpire
 Paul Townsend, British physicist
 Pearl Townsend (see Natalie Townsend)
 Peter Townsend (RAF officer) (1914–1995), British air-soldier and royal-family associate
 Peter Townsend (sociologist) (1928–2009), economist and author
 Prescott Townsend, American gay rights activist
 Primi Townsend, British actress
 Ralph Townsend, American author and activist
 Randolph Townsend, American politician
 Raymond Townsend (born 1955), American basketball player
 Richard Townsend (mathematician) (1821–1884), Irish mathematical physicist
 Richard Townsend (soldier), colonel of Oliver Cromwell's army
 Robert Townsend (disambiguation), several people
 Ryan Townsend, Australian footballer
 Simon Townsend, Australian television presenter
 Solomon Townsend, Revolutionary War era ship captain and ironworker
 Stacy Townsend, fictional character in Doctor Who
 Stephen J. Townsend, United States army officer
 Stuart Townsend, Irish actor and director
 Sue Townsend (1946–2014), English writer and humorist
 Tammy Townsend, American actress and singer
 Taylor Townsend (disambiguation)
 Tom Townsend, English bridge player
 Tom Townsend, name of Captain Flag, fictional character
 Tommy Townsend (born 1996), American football player
 Veronica Townsend, fictional character
 Wade Townsend, American baseball pitcher
 Wallace Townsend, American lawyer and politician
 Washington Townsend, American politician
 Willard Saxby Townsend (1895–1957), African-American labour leader
 William Townsend (disambiguation), several people
 William Cameron Townsend, prominent Christian missionary and founder of Wycliffe Bible Translators
 Yulia Townsend, Russian-born New Zealand singer

Fictional characters 

 Charlie Townsend, fictional character from Charlie’s Angels
 Dr. Leland Townsend, main character from American TV series Evil
 Mia Townsend, main character portrayed by American actress Josie Maran in the 2005 video game Need for Speed: Most Wanted

Townshend

 Anne Townshend (1573-1622), English Puritan
 Aurelian Townshend, English poet
 Cenzo Townshend, English music producer
 Charles Townshend (disambiguation)
 The Honorable Charlotte Anne Townshend, English landowner (Melbury House, Dorest) and daughter of the 9th Viscount Galway
 Chauncy Hare Townshend, English poet and collector
 Cliff Townshend, musician (1916–1986)
 Dorothea Petrie Townshend Carew (1895 - 1968), poet, writer and the editor of a literary magazine
 Emma Townshend, writer and musician, daughter of Pete Townshend
 George Townshend (disambiguation)
 Graeme Townshend, retired ice hockey forward
 Henry Townshend (disambiguation)
 John Townshend (disambiguation), several people
 Pete Townshend, guitarist and songwriter of The Who
 Robert "Fuzz" Townshend, British drummer
 Simon Townshend, musician (brother of Pete Townshend)
 Thomas Townshend, 1st Viscount Sydney
 William Townshend (colonial governor)

Fictional characters 

 Henry Townshend, main protagonist of the 2004 video game Silent Hill 4: The Room

Townesend
 Stephen Townesend (priest), Dean of Exeter, 1583–1588 
 Stephen Townesend (surgeon), English surgeon, stage actor, anti-vivisectionist and writer

Pseudonyms
 Mike Townsend, pseudonym of Michael McCrea, a British financial adviser, author and convicted killer

See also
 Townend (surname)
Tausend (surname)

References

English-language surnames